RogerEbert.com is an American film review website that archives reviews written by film critic Roger Ebert for the Chicago Sun-Times and also shares other critics' reviews and essays. The website, underwritten by the Chicago Sun-Times, was launched in 2002. Ebert handpicked writers from around the world to contribute to the website. After Ebert died in 2013, the website was relaunched under Ebert Digital, a partnership founded between Ebert, his wife Chaz, and friend Josh Golden.

Background
Two months after Ebert's death, Chaz Ebert hired film and television critic Matt Zoller Seitz as editor-in-chief for the website because his IndieWire blog PressPlay shared multiple contributors with RogerEbert.com, and because both websites promoted each other's content.

The Dissolves Noel Murray described the website's collection of Ebert reviews as "an invaluable resource, both for getting some front-line perspective on older movies, and for getting a better sense of who Ebert was." Murray said the website included reviews Ebert rarely discussed in conversation, such as those for Chelsea Girls (1966) and Good Times (1967), written when Ebert was in his twenties. R. Kurt Osenlund of Slant said in 2013 that other contributors (including Seitz, Sheila O'Malley, and Odie Henderson) had "a lot of first-person narrative" in their work like Ebert did, adding, "but there are other contributors, like Ignatiy Vishnevetsky, who don’t do so much of that. The overall diversity makes the site a kind of artists' collective."

RogerEbert.com has routinely hosted a "Women Writer's Week" in honor of Women's History Month, featuring content from female contributors for the entire week. Following the 2016 United States presidential election, the "Women Writer's Week" in 2017 was described by Observer to be "overtly political thanks to President Donald Trump". Chaz Ebert said the 2017 Women's March helped motivate female contributors to contribute their perspective to film and politics.

References

External links

American film review websites
Roger Ebert
Siskel and Ebert